The Adoration of the Shepherds or the Nativity is a 1490 painting by the Flemish painter Gerard David. It is now held in the Museum of Fine Arts, in Budapest.

References

1490 paintings
Paintings by Gerard David
David
Paintings in the collection of the Museum of Fine Arts (Budapest)